Mason City is the name of several places in the United States of America:

 Mason City, Illinois
 Mason City, Iowa
 Mason City, Nebraska
 Mason, West Virginia, also known as Mason City
 Mason, Ohio

See also
 Mason (disambiguation)

fr:Mason#Toponymes